Polemonium, commonly called Jacob's ladders or Jacob's-ladders (the name derived from the Biblical story), is a genus of between 25 and 40 species of flowering plants in the family Polemoniaceae, native to cool temperate to arctic regions of the Northern Hemisphere. One species also occurs in the southern Andes in South America. Many of the species grow at high altitudes, in mountainous areas. Most of the uncertainty in the number of species relates to those in Eurasia, many of which have been synonymized with Polemonium caeruleum.

Polemonium are perennial plants (rarely annual plants) growing 10–120 cm tall with bright green leaves divided into lance-shaped leaflets. They produce blue (rarely white or pink) flowers in the spring and summer.

Some species are used as food plants by the larvae of some Lepidoptera species including Coleophora polemoniella.

Species

 Kew's Plants of the World Online accepts 37 species. Many are locally known simply as "Jacob's ladder".

Polemonium acutiflorum – tall Jacob's ladder
Polemonium boreale  – northern Jacob's ladder
Polemonium brandegeei  – Brandegee's Jacob's ladder
Polemonium caeruleum  – Jacob's ladder (the original plant to bear this name); charity
Polemonium californicum  – showy Jacob's ladder
Polemonium campanulatum 
Polemonium carneum  – royal Jacob's ladder
Polemonium caucasicum 
Polemonium chartaceum  – Mason's Jacob's ladder
Polemonium chinense 
Polemonium confertum – Rocky Mountain Jacob's ladder
Polemonium eddyense  – Mount Eddy Jacob's-ladder
Polemonium elegans  – elegant Jacob's ladder
Polemonium elusum  – elusive Jacob's-ladder
Polemonium eximium  – sky pilot
Polemonium foliosissimum  – towering Jacob's ladder
Polemonium glabrum 
Polemonium grandiflorum  
Polemonium hingganicum 
Polemonium kiushianum 
Polemonium majus 
Polemonium mexicanum 
Polemonium micranthum  – annual polemonium
Polemonium nevadense  – Nevada Jacob's ladder
Polemonium occidentale  – western Jacob's ladder
Polemonium pauciflorum  – few-flower Jacob's ladder
Polemonium pectinatum  – Washington Jacob's ladder
Polemonium pulchellum 
Polemonium pulcherrimum  – beautiful Jacob's ladder
Polemonium reptans  – Jacob's ladder, Greek valerian
Polemonium sachalinense 
Polemonium schizanthum 
Polemonium schmidtii 
Polemonium × speciosum 
Polemonium sumushanense 
Polemonium vanbruntiae  – Vanbrunt's Jacob's ladder
Polemonium × victoris 
Polemonium vilosissimum 
Polemonium villosum 
Polemonium viscosum  – sticky polemonium
Polemonium yezoense

References

 
Polemoniaceae genera